Brockley and Ladywell Cemeteries (also known as Ladywell and Brockley Cemetery) were opened within one month of each other in 1858 and are sited on adjacent plots of previously open land. The two component parts are characteristic examples of the first wave of Victorian public cemeteries and are now part of the Brockley Conservation Area.

The cemeteries occupy  of land wholly within the London Borough of Lewisham and are owned and managed by the Cemeteries and Crematorium Services of the Borough.  They are also nature conservation sites of Borough Importance Grade 1 and a haven for wildlife, plants and wildflowers.

Until 1948, the two cemeteries were completely separate, being divided by a wall.  Ladywell Cemetery, which was previously known as Lewisham Cemetery, stands to the east of the wall and Brockley Cemetery, formerly Deptford Cemetery, lies to the west.  Both cemeteries hold a wealth of historical interest.  Evidence of Deptford's seafaring past can be found in the many inscriptions and adornments on the headstones.

Notable burials

 Joseph Henry Blackburne (1841–1924), dominated the English chess scene in late 19th century
 Commander Archibald Walter Buckle (1889–1927), commanded Anson Battalion of the 63rd (Royal Naval) Division in World War I
 Horatio Henry Couldery (1832–1918), one of the best-known Victorian painters of animals
 Jane Clouson (1854–1871), murdered girl with a monument paid for by public donations
 Ernest Dowson (1867–1900), poet and decadent movement artist
 Sir William Eames (1821–1897), marine engineer
 Sir John Gilbert (1817–1897), illustrator, drawing for the Illustrated London News and designed a cover for Punch
 Sir George Grove (1820–1900), first director of the Royal College of Music, 1882, and author of 'Dictionary of Music and Musicians'
 Sir William Hardy (1807–1887), Deputy Keeper of Public Records, 1878–1886
 Lionel de Jersey Harvard, commemoration to "the only Harvard to attend Harvard", died in World WarI, buried in France
 George Lacy Hillier (1856–1941), an English racing cyclist and pioneer of British cycling
 David Jones (1895–1974), war poet and artist
 Fernando Tarrida del Mármol (1861–1915), Cuban anarchist writer
 Margaret McMillan (1860–1931), educational reformer
 Sir Alexander Nisbet (1812–1892), Inspector General of the Royal Navy and honorary physician to the Queen
 William Stephens (1817–1871), Grand Warden of the Grand Lodge of England
 E. H. Windred (1875–1953), painter of racing pigeons
 Edward Lewis (1864–1922), Actor and Comedian.
 Joe Bowker (1881–1955) English boxer who was Bantamweight champion of the world in 1904 and 1905
 Samuel Tinsley (1847–1903), English chess player
 Mary Ann Bevan (1874–1933), "the ugliest woman in the world"
 Mrs Amelia Winters (1827–1889), poisoner
 Beatrice Offor (1864–1920), British painter

War graves

Both cemeteries contain war graves of Commonwealth service personnel registered and maintained by the Commonwealth War Graves Commission (CWGC).

Brockley Cemetery contains 195 war graves, 175 from World War I and 19 from World War II.  The majority of the graves lie in a War Plot.  On the cemetery's west side, a Screen Wall memorial lists those whose graves could not be marked by headstones.

Ladywell Cemetery contains 226 war graves from World War I and 18 from World War II.  A War Graves plot contains 100 graves, the names of those buried there being listed on a Screen War Memorial in Plot D, as well as those buried elsewhere in the cemetery whose graves could not be marked by headstones.  The CWGC also maintain a Commemorative Plot, in Plot B, on which 46 headstones have been erected.

Ladywell entrance gates
The Ladywell entrance to the cemetery is Grade II listed. This notes that the gates were built in 1857 to the designs of William Morphrew, for the Lewisham Burial Board. The gates are made of wrought iron, the piers of stone; square, with set back, sloping tops culminating in saddleback gables. The gates are of florid Gothic design, the monogram of the Lewisham Burial Board in the three lower hubs to each gate, with trefoil and barley sugar decoration above. The name LADYWELL CEMETERY may have been inserted, or is more likely a reworking of the original name LEWISHAM CEMETERY; the style of the lettering, however, is clearly of 1857.

References

 Brockley Conservation Area. Character Appraisal. Conservation & Urban Design Team. Submitted to the Mayor & Cabinet Meeting on 14 December 2005
 A Guide To The Flora, Fauna and Local History to be found in Brockley and Ladywell Cemeteries: Lewisham Council

External links

 Lewisham Cemeteries and crematoriums
 Friends of Brockley and Ladywell Cemeteries
  North West Kent Family History Society: Ladywell & Brockley Cemetery
 
  Commonwealth War Graves Commission (CWGC) Brockley: Cemetery Details 
  Commonwealth War Graves Commission (CWGC) Ladywell Cemetery Details

Cemeteries in London
1858 establishments in England
Parks and open spaces in the London Borough of Lewisham
Religion in the London Borough of Lewisham
Nature reserves in the London Borough of Lewisham
Commonwealth War Graves Commission cemeteries in England
Grade II listed buildings in the London Borough of Lewisham